The 2009 WNBL Finals was the postseason tournament of the WNBL's 2008–09 season. The Adelaide Lightning were the defending champions but were defeated by Townsville in the Semi-finals. The Canberra Capitals won their sixth WNBL championship with a 61–58 win over the Bulleen Boomers.

Standings

Bracket
<onlyinclude>

Elimination final

(4) Adelaide Lightning vs. (5) Bendigo Spirit

Semi-finals

(1) Canberra Capitals vs. (2) Bulleen Boomers

(3) Townsville Fire  vs. (4) Adelaide Lightning

Preliminary final

(2) Bulleen Boomers vs. (3) Townsville Fire

Grand Final

(1) Canberra Capitals vs. (2) Bulleen Boomers

Rosters

References 

2009 Finals
2008-09
Women's National Basketball League Finals
2008–09 in Australian basketball
Aus
basketball
basketball